Edwin Clark may refer to:

 Edwin Clark (civil engineer) (1814–1894), English civil engineer
 Edwin N. Clark (1902–1982), US Army general
 Edwin Hill Clark (1878–1967), American architect
 Edwin Clark (politician) (born 1927), Nigerian politician

See also
Edwin Clarke (1919–1996), British medical historian and neurologist
Edward Clark (disambiguation)